The Australian Labor Party (New South Wales Branch), also known as NSW Labor, is the New South Wales branch of the Australian Labor Party. The parliamentary leader is elected from and by the members of the party caucus, comprising all party members in the Legislative Assembly and Legislative Council. The party factions have a strong influence on the election of the leader. The leader's position is dependent on the continuing support of the caucus (and party factions) and the leader may be deposed by failing to win a vote of confidence of parliamentary members. By convention, the premier sits in the Legislative Assembly, and is the leader of the party controlling a majority in that house. The party leader also typically is a member of the Assembly, though this is not a strict party constitutional requirement. Barrie Unsworth, for example, was elected party leader while a member of the Legislative Council. He then transferred to the Assembly by winning a seat at a by-election.

When the Labor party wins sufficient seats to be able to control a majority in the Legislative Assembly, the party leader becomes the State Premier and Labor will form the government. When Labor is the largest party not in government, the party leader becomes the Leader of the Opposition. To become a premier or opposition leader, the party leader must be or within a short period of time become a member of the Legislative Assembly.

History

Early history
The NSW branch of the Australian Labor Party, known as the Labor Electoral League of New South Wales from 1891 to 1917, first won 35 of the 141 seats in the NSW parliament at the 1891 election. The initial caucus voted against appointing a leader and the party was directed by a steering committee of five members until, following a request from the party's extra-parliamentary executive, Joseph Cook was elected as the first leader in 1893. Cook left the party in the following year when he was obliged to sign a pledge that he would support all caucus decisions in parliament. James McGowen, who signed the pledge, succeeded Cook as party leader in 1894. At the 1894 state election Labor representation was reduced to 18. After the 1898 election, Labor held the balance of power with George Reid's Free Trade government being dependent on Labor to push through New South Wales' adoption of Federation. McGowen's support for Federation was critical to Labor maintaining its support for the adoption of measures to implement Federation, even though the party remained opposed to the adopted Constitution, which it saw as biased in favour of business interests. The 1904 state election saw Labor become the second largest party and the official opposition for the first time.

First government in New South Wales and internal divisions
At the 1910 election, the Labor Party first won government in NSW with a slim majority of 46 of 90 seats; as a result, McGowen was premier from 1910 to 1913. But increasing success was accompanied by increasing tensions within the labour movement: from the 1890s the Australian Workers' Union attempted to assert its influence on the NSW parliamentary party, with little success for many years. Divisions also opened up between state and federal Labor after Andrew Fisher took office as Prime Minister of the first federal Labor government in 1908: William Holman, the NSW party's main parliamentary strategist at the time, presented a policy agenda at state party conferences which differed from that approved by the federal party, in particular in its opposition to the transfer of responsibilities for finance and industrial relations from the state to the Commonwealth government, a dispute in which the AWU sided with the ALP. Tensions continued to rise during McGowen's premiership, as McGowen and Holman refused to support the holding of the 1911 trade and commerce referendum favoured by the ALP: in addition Holman alienated extra-parliamentary Labor members and some of the NSW caucus by appointing a number of new members to the state's Legislative Council, including some who were not Labor members. This ran counter to the state party's platform, which advocated for the abolition of the Council, something which was not attempted by the state Labor governments of the 1910s, and which was a divisive issue in the party at the time.

McGowen was deposed by his deputy Holman after McGowen attempted to break a gas workers' strike by threatening to replace strikers with non-union labour. Upon the outbreak of World War I, Holman announced a truce with the state Commonwealth Liberal Party which would take industrial reform off the agenda for the remainder of the war. In addition, the prospect of putting the economy on a war footing increased fears regarding job losses. These developments increased disillusion with Labor among unions and encouraged thinking about new political strategies. In November 1915 Labor affiliated unions in NSW, led by the AWU, formed the Industrial Section, the first formally organised Labor faction in Australia, with the aim of asserting control over the NSW parliamentary party. At the state party conference in April 1916, the Industrial Section, swept the party's internal elections, taking 31 out of 36 offices including the party's presidency. The Industrial Section became a model for later factional organisations in the ALP, both in New South Wales and nationwide.

Conscription split
The conscription issue divided the Labor Party and wider Australian community in 1916. While much of the Australian labour movement and general community was opposed to conscription, Australian Labor Prime Minister Billy Hughes and Premier Holman strongly supported conscription, and both crossed the floor to vote with the conservative parties, and both were expelled from the Labor Party. When Hughes met with the executive of NSW Labor in September 1916 to attempt to persuade them to back his conscription plan, he lost the vote 21–5 and was warned that he would be expelled if he continued to press the matter. Ernest Durack became state party leader, while Holman formed a coalition on 15 November 1916 with the leader of the opposition Liberal Reform Party, Charles Wade, with himself as Premier. Following the exodus of pro-conscription MPs from the party, many leaders of the Industrial Section took advantage of the new vacancies to secure selection for open seats. Early in 1917, Holman and his supporters merged with Liberal Reform to form the state branch of the Nationalist Party of Australia, with Holman as leader.  At the 1917 election, the Nationalists won a huge victory. During his leadership of the Nationalist government, Holman vigorously defended the government-owned enterprises from his fellow conservatives in power. Durack's leadership lasted only for about three months, and he was succeeded by John Storey in February 1917. In April 1918 the Industrial Section changed its name to the Industrial Vigilance Council, a change in part prompted by a leftward shift in the union movement influenced by the Great War and the Russian Revolution. At this point it was increasingly beset by internal divisions, in particular between the relatively conservative AWU and smaller unions and radicals such as the syndicalist-influenced Sam Rosa. This came to a head during 1919 due to divisions over whether conscription should end following the closing of the First World War and whether the Australian union movement should adopt the syndicalist principle of the One Big Union. The faction was wound up in August 1919, with many of its radicals such as Albert Willis going on to form the Industrial Socialist Labor Party. This left the state party firmly in the control of the AWU At the 1920 election, Holman and his Nationalists were thrown from office in a massive swing, being succeeded by a Labor Government led by Storey. Labor won the 1920 election with a majority of one.

Dooley–Storey era
On Storey's death in October 1921, James Dooley became leader of the party and premier. His government was defeated on the floor of the House on 13 December 1921, but new Premier George Fuller lost a vote within seven hours of his appointment, and Dooley regained power. He lost the 1922 election to Fuller in a highly sectarian election campaign. As the result of a dispute with a party executive, dominated by the Australian Workers' Union, Dooley was expelled from the party in February 1923 and replaced by Greg McGirr as leader, but the Federal Executive intervened and appointed Bill Dunn as an interim leader until Jack Lang was elected by the caucus, with the support of more radical unions, most prominently Albert Willis and his Australian Coal and Shale Employees' Federation.

Lang era

Lang led the ALP to victory in the 1925 election and became Premier. His support in the caucus was challenged in 1926 and in that year the party's annual State Conference, which strongly supported Lang, assumed the right to select the leader instead of caucus. The following year Lang and his extra-parliamentary allies drastically altered the party rules so that State Conference delegates and members of the Central Executive were elected in a complicated group system. The ALP was defeated at the 1927 election but won in a landslide at the 1930 election.

Lang opposed the Premiers' Plan to combat the Great Depression agreed to by the federal Labor government of James Scullin and the other state Premiers, who called for even more stringent cuts to government spending to balance the budget. In March 1931, the NSW branch of the party was expelled by the Federal Executive in the Federal Conference.

In October 1931, Lang's followers in the federal House of Representatives crossed the floor to vote with the conservative United Australia Party and bring down the Scullin government.

This action split the NSW Labor Party in two – Lang's followers and the expelled NSW branch became known as Lang Labor, while Scullin's supporters, led by Chifley, became known in NSW as Federal Labor. Most of the party's branches and affiliated trade unions supported Lang. Furthermore, Lang's persistence with his plan led to the Lang Dismissal Crisis in 1931–32 which led to his dismissal as premier by the State Governor on 13 May 1932. The Governor appointed the UAP leader, Bertram Stevens, as premier and Stevens immediately called the 1932 election, at which Labor was heavily defeated. In February 1936, the NSW branch rejoined the Australian Labor Party and became the official NSW branch of the ALP again. Federal Labor was then abolished.

Lang's lack of success at state elections eroded his support within the labour movement. He had not won a state election since 1930. This led some members of caucus, including Bob Heffron, to break away to form the Industrial Labor Party. In 1939, following intervention by the Federal Executive, the two factions were reunited at a state conference. This gathering also reversed the "red rules" and returned the power of selecting the party leader to the caucus. Lang was deposed in 1939.

McKell and post-war era
William McKell became party leader, reuniting and rejuvenating the party. Under his leadership the extreme left wing of the party had been expelled and had contested the 1941 election as the far left wing State Labor Party. McKell led Labor to a convincing victory and became Premier. State Labor's poor showing had resulted in its dissolution shortly after the election. During World War II McKell became a close collaborator of Labor Prime Ministers John Curtin and Ben Chifley, being a particularly close friend of the latter.  Labor unity was again threatened by Jack Lang who had been expelled from the Labor Party in 1943 and formed another version of the Lang Labor Party. On this occasion he received no support from the rest of the caucus and spent the rest of the term as the sole member.  At the 1944 election McKell won another victory, the first time a New South Wales Labor government had been re-elected.  On early 1947 he resigned and announced acceptance of appointment as Governor General. James McGirr was elected leader and premier and led Labor to another victory at the 1947 election. McGirr nearly lost the 1950 election and was replaced in 1952 by Joseph Cahill.

Labor in government, 1952–1965
Cahill decisively won the 1953 election. He was desperate to keep the New South Wales branch of the ALP united despite the sectarian and ideological split that resulted in the formation of the right-wing Democratic Labor Party in 1954. He achieved this by controlling the anti-DLP faction in his party. The DLP did not contest the 1956 election, which Labor won. Cahill was returned in the 1959 election, but died in office later that year. He was succeeded as leader and premier by Bob Heffron. Heffron continued the Labor reign in New South Wales winning the 1962 election. Heffron resigned the leadership and premiership in 1964, and was succeeded by Jack Renshaw, who lost the premiership at the 1965 election ending 24 years of Labor power in the state.

Opposition, 1965–1976
Renshaw also lost the 1968 election, after which he resigned the leadership, to be succeeded by Pat Hills. Hills lost the 1971 and 1973 election after which he was deposed by Neville Wran.

Wran–Unsworth era, 1976–1988
Wran narrowly won the 1976 election and remained premier until 1986. He was succeeded by Barrie Unsworth who took over the premiership until Labor's loss at the 1988 election, after which he resigned.

Carr era, 1988–2005
Bob Carr became leader in 1988 and led Labor to victory in the 1995 election. Carr was premier for 10 years, before resigning in 2005. He was the longest continuous-serving premier in New South Wales.

Iemma era, 2005–2008

Carr was succeeded by Morris Iemma. At the time, the state transport network was inferior, and public transport was often criticised as the most stark example of Carr's inaction. Iemma and the Treasurer Michael Costa supported the idea to sidestep the high costs and industrial risks of the existing RailCorp network and instead begin building a new rapid transit rail system in parallel. The new system would incorporate smaller, lighter rolling stock, reducing construction costs, and be operated by the private sector, reducing operating costs. But despite the savings available via the rapid transit option, the costs were still beyond the state's means.

Iemma comfortably won the 2007 election with the loss of only four seats. His strategy was to draw a line under the failures of the Carr era and ask the electorate for another chance. The Opposition ran a poor campaign, and the electorate was minded to trust the affable, hard-working new premier. Iemma was returned but with far less political capital than the size of Labor's majority would suggest.

Proposed electricity privatisation

Journalist Simon Benson describes a crucial meeting in late 2007 between Iemma and Labor state president Bernie Riordan during the height of the furore over electricity privatisation:

[Iemma] had laid out on his desk a spreadsheet of infrastructure projects … On the bottom half were all the projects the state needed if it was to avoid choking on its own congestion within the next decade. It amounted to more than $25 billion. And that was what they hadn't even announced."This is why I am the Premier," he told Riordan, emphasising his belief that it was critical for the privatisation to succeed. "These [projects] need to be done. I need to do these."

Immediately following the 2007 election, Iemma and Treasurer Costa secretly plotted their strategy for the next four years, under the heading of "bullets to bite". Both knew that if they were to build the new rapid transit system and address the growing crisis in electricity supply, they would need to bring the private sector into the state's electricity industry first.

The federal party's immediate political needs intervened, with the new federal Labor leader Kevin Rudd persuading Iemma to defer his privatisation announcement until after the 2007 federal election. Rudd felt he could ill afford the distraction of a debate over asset sales in the country's most populous state. With the funding source a secret, the rapid transit plan had to be kept under wraps as well.

Along with his plan to sell the government's electricity generation and retailing companies, Iemma announced a massive infrastructure scheme involving South West Rail Link, an inner city motorway network, and the Metro Link network, a system of underground, privately operated, single-deck, automated trains. The government planned to use up to $3 billion from the sale of retail electricity to help fund the inner city motorway network, linking the M4 Western Motorway to the CBD and the airport

The Electrical Trades Union (ETU) was ideologically opposed to the privatisation of the electricity businesses and led opposition to the plan. The ETU's secretary, Bernie Riordan, was also the president of NSW Labor. The secretary of the Unions NSW, John Robertson, was also a member of the ETU and opposed the privatisation. The party secretary, Karl Bitar, and his deputy, Luke Foley, were less ideologically committed on the issue, but their polling showed that the public was against a sale and – more importantly – tiring of Iemma and his team. They too came down against Iemma's plan.

What followed was an extraordinary, year-long struggle by the party's head office and affiliated trade unions to force cabinet and caucus to abandon an already-announced policy. Robertson, Bitar and Foley had the union-dominated party conference pass a motion reminding MPs of the party's notional commitment to democratic socialism. Next, union and party officials began threatening Labor MPs with disendorsement if they voted with the Premier on privatisation. Remembering the promise Rudd had made to him in 2007, Iemma called on the Prime Minister to have the federal party intervene to protect MPs who sided with the Government. Rudd declined. Former Prime Minister Paul Keating, former premiers Carr, Barrie Unsworth and Neville Wran, and former Labor Council secretaries Michael Easson and John McBean came out publicly in support of Iemma.

On 3 May 2008, the NSW Labor's State Conference rejected, by 702 to 107 votes, the Iemma government's plans to privatise the state's electricity system.

Two members of the party's Socialist Left faction, upper house MPs Lynda Voltz and Ian West, succumbed to the pressure and announced that they would vote against the party on privatisation. Had the vote gone ahead, it would have been the first instance of a Labor MP 'crossing the floor' in 14 years of government. The Liberal Opposition, led by moderate Barry O'Farrell, saw an opportunity to wound Iemma by denying him the opportunity to build the metro. Together, West, Voltz, the Greens and the Opposition had the numbers to defeat the Government in the upper house in August 2008.

On 3 September 2008, Deputy Premier and Transport Minister John Watkins announced he was going to retire for family reasons, triggering a cabinet reshuffle. On 4 September 2008, Costa was advised by Iemma that he would no longer be in the forthcoming reshuffle and hence dumped as Treasurer. Iemma had also proposed that other ministers would be dumped, including Health Minister Reba Meagher. Iemma's faction, Centre Unity, supported the sacking of the Treasurer but not the other four Ministers. The following day, right-wing Labor powerbrokers Eddie Obeid and Joe Tripodi told Iemma that he had lost the support of MPs and would not survive a caucus meeting. Nathan Rees also walked into the meeting with a number of Labor MPs announcing he had the numbers to overthrow Iemma. Seeing that he had lost the support of his caucus faction, Iemma resigned as leader and Premier. He was replaced by Rees as leader and Premier.

Rees and Keneally era, 2008–2011
Rees was leader and premier for only 15 months before he was deposed by Kristina Keneally, who resigned after Labor was defeated in a landslide at the 2011 election.

Opposition, 2011–present
Keneally was succeeded by John Robertson. He resigned in December 2014, after the 2014 Sydney hostage crisis, after it was revealed that he had had contact with Man Haron Monis, who was one of Robertson's constituents. On 5 January 2015 Luke Foley was elected leader. In the 2015 state election, Labor achieved a 9.9-point two-party-preferred swing, but the Coalition comfortably retained government. Foley resigned in November 2018 in the face of sexual assault allegations, and was succeeded by Michael Daley in the resulting leadership contest. In the 2019 election, the party recorded a small TPP swing in its favour and won two seats, but remained in opposition. On 25 March 2019, Daley announced his intention to step down as leader. Penny Sharpe, who was elected deputy leader in November 2018, served as interim leader until the leadership ballot was held in June; Jodi McKay was elected leader. In May 2021, McKay resigned the leadership, and was replaced by Chris Minns on 4 June 2021.

Attempted party reforms 
Between 2009 and 2014, the Independent Commission Against Corruption (ICAC) began or completed a series of investigations into the behaviours of a number of Labor politicians, including Angela D'Amore, Tony Kelly, Ian Macdonald, Eddie Obeid, Karyn Paluzzano, and Joe Tripodi. The ICAC made a series of adverse findings against all six politicians, although Paluzzano was the only one to face criminal charges. For bringing the party into disrepute, Kelly had his membership of Labor terminated in 2011; both Macdonald and Obeid had their membership terminated in 2013; and Tripodi suffered the same fate in 2014. Other investigations and criminal charges were laid against Craig Thomson, a federal politician from New South Wales, and Michael Williamson, a senior Labor official, also from New South Wales. Both Thomson and Williamson were adversely implicated in the Health Services Union expenses affair. Their membership of NSW Labor was terminated in 2014.

Seeking to stamp out perceived corruption and factional infighting, Senator John Faulkner began a process of reforms that proposed to include rankandfile members in decisions such as the selection of candidates for Senate and Legislative Council vacancies and party tickets, and a vote in the direct election of the New South Wales parliamentary leaders. However, Faulkner's reform proposals were mostly rejected at NSW Labor's 2014 conference. The direct election of party leader gained support with effect from after the 2015 election.

Following the suspension of the general secretary of NSW Labor, Kaila Murnain in 2019, the NSW Labor Leader Jodi McKay and federal Labor Leader Anthony Albanese announced a further review into the party. Michael Lavarch conducted the review after Murnain admitted to the Independent Commission Against Corruption (New South Wales) that she was aware that billionaire property developer Huang Xiangmo made an illegal $100,000 donation to NSW Labor in 2016. The Lavarch Review recommended changes to internal governance and oversight mechanisms within NSW Labor including the establishment of a State Executive Board to oversee the existing NSW Labor Administrative Committee.

Country Labor
Country Labor was a subsection of the ALP, and was used as a designation by candidates contesting elections in rural areas. It functioned as a sort of ginger group within the party, and was somewhat analogous to its youth wing. The Country Labor Party was registered as a separate party in NSW, until 2021 and was also registered with the Australian Electoral Commission (AEC) for federal elections.

The creation of a separate designation for rural candidates was first suggested at the June 1999 ALP state conference in NSW. In May 2000, following Labor's success at the 2000 Benalla by-election in Victoria, Kim Beazley announced that the ALP intended to register a separate "Country Labor Party" with the AEC; this occurred in October 2000. The Country Labor designation is most frequently used in New South Wales. According to the ALP's financial statements for the 2015–16 financial year, NSW Country Labor had around 2,600 members (around 17 percent of the party total), but almost no assets. It recorded a severe funding shortfall at the 2015 NSW state election, and had to rely on a $1.68 million loan from the party proper to remain solvent. It had been initially assumed that the party proper could provide the money from its own resources, but the NSW Electoral Commission ruled that this was impermissible because the parties were registered separately. Instead the party proper had to loan Country Labor the required funds at a commercial interest rate.

The dedicated Country Labor political party was de-registered in October 2021 in a major party reform. Instead of a dedicated political party, the ALP instead pledged to dedicate "30 per cent of winnable seats in upper house ticket to people who live in regional NSW".

Other Labor-aligned groups
In New South Wales, a number of groups have been formed as associates of the NSW branch. These groups are divided along policy, cultural and professional lines. They include the following:

 Sub-Continent Friends of Labor
 Arabic Friends of Labor
 Chinese Friends of Labor
 Labor Action for Multicultural Policy
 Labor Science Network
 NSW Society of Labor Lawyers
 Labor Environment Action Network
 Aboriginal Labor Network
 Labor for Treaty
 Labor for the Arts
 Irish Friends of Labor

List of parliamentary leaders

List of deputy parliamentary leaders

Executive leaders

Presidents

General secretaries

Election results

State elections

Federal elections

Notes

References

New South Wales branch
New South Wales branch
New South Wales branch of the Australian Labor Party
Political parties established in 1891
Labor
Labor